Basher Dimalaang Manalao or known to be Mostaqbal, a Maranao people, Islamic preacher (Ulama or Aleem) and was elected vice-governor then succeeded by law the governor of Lanao del Sur in the Philippines following the death of former governor Mamintal Adiong Sr. in 2004. He took his Islamic degree (Arabic: كوليت) at King Saud University.

He owns an organization Philippine Al-Mostaqbal Incorporation educating members about Islamic cultures, future, and science of Qur’an. Dominant members of his organization were women. The organization established a Facebook page named “Mostaqbal Online Channel” with having over 8.5k followers. He had little or no interest in politics.

He established a public cemetery called “Maqbara” located at Barangay Guimba, Marawi City, Lanao del Sur in the Philippines during his term as governor of the province. Due to political dispute, he was suspended in 3 months by a petition of Monera Macabangon in 2006. He then returned to the office of governor by the decision of the court.

Early life 
Mostaqbal was born in his home town Tamparan, Lanao del Sur in the Philippines. He graduated high school at Ma’ahad Mindanao Al-Arabi newly Jamiatu Muslim Mindanao and proceeded to Islamic education at King Saud University.

See also 
 Autonomous Region in Muslim Mindanao
Bangsamoro Autonomous Region in Muslim Mindanao
Jamiatu Muslim Mindanao

References 

Filipino Muslims
King Saud University alumni
Filipino missionaries
People from Lanao del Sur
Living people
Year of birth missing (living people)
Muslim missionaries